Myctophum aurolaternatum, the golden lanternfish, is a species of lanternfish.

References

Hulley, P.A., 1986. Myctophidae. p. 282-321. In M.M. Smith and P.C. Heemstra (eds.) Smiths' sea fishes. Springer-Verlag, Berlin.

External links

Myctophidae
Taxa named by Samuel Garman
Fish described in 1899